Saint John Bosco: Mission to Love is a 2004 Italian television movie directed by Lodovico Gasparini. The film is based on real life events of Roman Catholic priest John Bosco.

Cast 

 Flavio Insinna as Don Giovanni Bosco
 Lina Sastri as  Margherita Occhiena
 Charles Dance as  Marquis Clementi
 Alessandra Martines as Marchesa Barolo
 Daniel Tschirley as Michele Rua 
 Ry Finerty as  Giovanni Cagliero
 Lewis Crutch as Domenico Savio
 James Greene as Giuseppe Cafasso
 Paolo Calabresi as Lorenzo Gastaldi 
 Arnaldo Ninchi as  Pope Pius IX
 Brock Everitt-Elwick as  Giovanni Bosco ragazzo
 Sam Beazley as  Don Giovanni Calosso 
 Andrea Bosca as Enrico Zarello

References

External links

2004 television films
2004 films
Italian television films
2004 biographical drama films
Films set in the 19th century
Films set in Italy
Italian biographical drama films
Films about Catholic priests
Films about religion
Films directed by Lodovico Gasparini